Navadurga is a Gaupalika in Dadeldhura District in the Sudurpashchim Province of far-western Nepal. 
Navadurga has a population of 19957.The land area is 141.89 km2. It was formed by merging Koteli, Manilek, Navadurga and Belapur VDCs.

References

Rural municipalities in Dadeldhura District
Rural municipalities of Nepal established in 2017